Charles Webster may refer to:
Charles Webster (cricketer) (1838–1881), first class cricketer who played for Yorkshire County Cricket Club
Charles Carroll Webster (1824-1893), American lawyer and politician
Charles L. Webster (1851–1891), publisher of many of Mark Twain's books and Twain's business manager
Charles L. Webster and Company (1884–1894), publishing company founded by Mark Twain and named for and managed by Charles L. Webster
Charles Webster (historian) (1886–1961), British historian and diplomat
Charles Webster (historian of medicine), historian and academic
Charles Webster (musician) (born c. 1965), British electronic musician and producer
Charlie Webster (politician), American politician
Charles Webster (priest), Dean of Ross
Charlie Webster (footballer), English association footballer

See also
Charles Webster Leadbeater (1854–1934), member of the Theosophical Society and author on occult subjects
Charles Webster Hawthorne (1872–1930), American portrait and genre painter
Charlie Webster (Charlotte Webster, born 1982), English television presenter